American-born British actor and filmmaker Terry Gilliam, known for his work with the Monty Python comedy troupe, has directed 13 feature films and five short films, and written for several additional films and television series.  He received the 1988 BAFTA Award along with other Monty Python members for Outstanding British Contribution to Cinema, and in 2009 received the BAFTA Fellowship for lifetime achievement.

Filmography

Films

Shorts

Contributing work

Television

Series

Contributing writer

Advertisements 
MTV "Boogeyman" (1987)
Secret Tournament (2002)
The Rematch (2002)

Acting roles

References

External sources

Male actor filmographies
British filmographies
Filmography
American filmographies